Ryan Pronk (born 1986) is a national checkers champion from Arizona. He holds the title of Arizona State and Western Regional champion. Ryan began playing checkers in the summer of 2000, at age 14, and played in his first tournament in 2002. In 2004 he became the Minnesota State Champion, Midwest Regional Champion, and Tennessee State Majors Champion. In 2005 Ryan won the United States Junior Championship, and repeated this victory in 2006 and 2007. In 2011, Ryan won the North Carolina 11-man ballot. Ryan lives in Virginia where he won the 2011 state championship. Ryan is ranked 20th draughts player in the world. He remains active in the checkers community.

Sources
1. The American Checker Federation, Ryan Pronk 
2. USA checkers 
3. North Carolina Checker Association 
4. The ACF forum

American checkers players
1986 births
Living people